The Paris Grand Slam (formerly International Tournament of Paris) is an international, judo competition held at the Palais Omnisports de Paris-Bercy in Paris, as part of the IJF World Tour Grand Slam series organized by the IJF.

Venues
 Stade Pierre de Coubertin (1971–1999)
 Palais Omnisports de Paris-Bercy (2000–)

Past winners

Men's

Women's

See also

Judo Grand Slam Tournois de Paris (TIVP) 2014
Judo Grand Slam Tournois de Paris (TIVP) 2013
Judo Grand Slam Tournois de Paris (TIVP) 2012
Judo Grand Slam Tournois de Paris (TIVP) 2011
Judo Grand Slam Tournois de Paris (TIVP) 2010
Judo Grand Slam Tournois de Paris (TIVP) 2009

References

Paris
Judo competitions in France
Judo in Paris
Judo
Judo